Charles Christie Graham (22 April 1835 – 27 December 1915) was a 19th-century Member of Parliament in Otago, New Zealand.

Biography

Born on 22 April 1835 in Cupar, Fife, Scotland, Graham was educated at the University of Edinburgh. He emigrated to Victoria in Australia in 1855, and then moved to New Zealand in 1866.

He represented the Oamaru electorate from an 1869 by-election to 1870, when he retired.

He died at his home in Dunedin on 27 December 1915, and was buried in Andersons Bay Cemetery.

References

1835 births
1915 deaths
People from Cupar
Scottish emigrants to Australia
Scottish emigrants to New Zealand
Members of the New Zealand House of Representatives
New Zealand MPs for South Island electorates
Burials at Andersons Bay Cemetery
19th-century New Zealand politicians